The 2018–19 UEFA Youth League was the sixth season of the UEFA Youth League, a European youth club football competition organised by UEFA.

The final was played on 29 April 2019 at the Colovray Stadium in Nyon, Switzerland, between English side Chelsea and Portuguese side Porto. In their first appearance in the final, Porto won 3–1 and secured their first title in the competition, the first ever for a Portuguese team. Barcelona were the defending champions, but were eliminated by Chelsea in the semi-finals, in a rematch of the previous season's final.

Teams
A total of 64 teams from at least 32 of the 55 UEFA member associations may enter the tournament. They are split into two sections, each with 32 teams:
UEFA Champions League Path:  The youth teams of the 32 clubs which qualified for the 2018–19 UEFA Champions League group stage entered the UEFA Champions League Path. Should there was a vacancy (youth teams not entering), it was filled by a team defined by UEFA.
Domestic Champions Path: The youth domestic champions of the top 32 associations according to their 2017 UEFA country coefficients entered the Domestic Champions Path. Should there was a vacancy (associations with no youth domestic competition, as well as youth domestic champions already included in the UEFA Champions League path), it was first filled by the title holders should they had not yet qualified, and then by the youth domestic champions of the next association in the UEFA ranking.

For this season, 37 associations are represented.

Notes

Squads
Players must be born on or after 1 January 2000, with a maximum of five players born between 1 January 1999 and 31 December 1999 allowed in the 40-player squad, and a maximum of three of these players allowed per each match.

Starting from this season, up to five substitutions are permitted per team in each match.

Round and draw dates
The schedule of the competition is as follows (all draws are held at the UEFA headquarters in Nyon, Switzerland, unless stated otherwise).

Notes
For the UEFA Champions League Path group stage, in principle the teams play their matches on Tuesdays and Wednesdays of the matchdays as scheduled for UEFA Champions League, and on the same day as the corresponding senior teams; however, matches may also be played on other dates, including Mondays and Thursdays.
For the Domestic Champions Path first and second rounds, in principle matches are played on Wednesdays (first round on matchdays 2 and 3, second round on matchdays 4 and 5, as scheduled for UEFA Champions League); however, matches may also be played on other dates, including Mondays, Tuesdays and Thursdays.
For the play-offs, round of 16 and quarter-finals, in principle matches are played on Tuesdays and Wednesdays of the matchdays as scheduled; however, matches may also be played on other dates, provided they are completed before the following dates:
Play-offs: 21 February 2019
Round of 16: 15 March 2019
Quarter-finals: 5 April 2019

UEFA Champions League Path

Group A

Group B

Group C

Group D

Group E

Group F

Group G

Group H

Domestic Champions Path

First round

Second round

Play-offs

Knockout phase

Bracket (round of 16 onwards)

Round of 16

Quarter-finals

Semi-finals

Final

Top scorers

Notes

References

External links

 
Youth
2018-19
2018 in youth association football
2019 in youth association football